Rauza Sharif or Shaikh Ahmad al-Faruqī al-Sirhindī Dargah (popularly known as Mujaddid, Alf-Sani)
 is situated on the Sirhind-Bassi Pathana Road at a small distance to the north of Gurdwara Fatehgarh Sahib. Sheikh Ahmed Farooqi lived at this place during the times of Akbar and Jahangir from 1563 to 1624.

Muslim visitation
The Urs celebration (death anniversary) of the Mujadid are held here for more than 300 years and are largely attended by Muslims from India, Pakistan, Afghanistan, Indonesia, Bangladesh and other Muslim countries.
Author to mention Day/Month of the year when the urs is celebrated here.

Monument compound
There are a number of other tombs in the compound mostly of the members of Shaikh Ahmad's house. The mausoleum is a fine building made of bricks partly overlaid with stone and marble. Close to it there is the mausoleum of Rati-ud-Din, an ancestor of the Mujadid. Not far here are the rauzas of Mujaddid’s sons Khawaja Muhammad Sadiq and Khwaja Muhammad Masum. The rauza of latter is some times called rauza chini on account of its excellent mosaic work. In its premises are many other graves of the members of the house of the said reformer and some members of the ruling family of Kabul.  There is a grand mosque with a basement and a small tank for performing ablution before the prayers.  The shrine has since been taken over by Government of India as a historic monument and regular employees have been kept here for its maintenance, up keep and care.

By the side of the Rauza are the tombs of the Afghan Ruler, Shah Zaman and his Queen.

Other nearby Tombs
Other tombs situated around Sirhind city are:

Tomb of Ustad and Shagird

There are two tombs situated at a distance of about one kilometre west of Rauza Sharif in village Talanian, these are commonly known as the tombs of Ustad Syad Khan (master mason) and Shagird (apprentice mason). It is said that these buildings were constructed by them during their lifetime, some times in the 16th century. The tombs separated from each other by a distance of about 200 metres, are fair examples of contemporary architectural skill, including glazed ornamentation. The design of two are identical but there are few differences in minor details. The building of Ustad’s tomb has  been protected under the Punjab Ancient and Historical Monuments and Archaeological Sites and Remains Act, 1964.

Tomb of Mir-I-Miran
This tomb is situated 5 kilometre north to the Aam Khas Bagh, Sirhind and is connected by a link road. The tomb of Mir-I-Miran is the only important building of stone in Sirhind. It is believed that Mir-I-Miran was a great saint of the place to whom Bahlol Lodhi’s daughter were married. Another important old monument in the vicinity of Mir-I-Miran’s tomb is a tank called Bibi sar, meaning Lady’s Tank. It is said that this tank was constructed by Bahlol’s daughter after the death of her husband. According to another tradition the tank was constructed by Sultan Sikander Lodhi in the name of his sister, wife of Mir-I-Miran. Sultan Bahlol was crowned at Sirhind, he would therefore regard it as a fortunate place for himself and the area was given in Jagir by Sultan Lodhi to a holy man, together with his daughter’s hand. After the Saint's death, the present tomb was built by Bahlol Lodhi and known as tomb of Mir-I-Miran.

References

External links
Rauza Sharif @Wikimapia

Buildings and structures in Punjab, India
Islamic pilgrimages
Fatehgarh Sahib
Ziyarat
Dargahs in India
Sufi shrines in India
Tourist attractions in Punjab, India